Peter Johansson (born 12 August 1948) is a Danish former footballer who played as a forward for Slagelse B&I and Belgian club KV Mechelen. He made three appearances for the Denmark national team in 1972.

References

External links
 
 

1948 births
Living people
Footballers from Copenhagen
Danish men's footballers
Association football forwards
Denmark international footballers
Denmark youth international footballers
Denmark under-21 international footballers
FC Vestsjælland players
K.V. Mechelen players
Danish expatriate men's footballers
Danish expatriate sportspeople in Belgium
Expatriate footballers in Belgium